Green Bus Lines, also referred to simply as Green Lines, was a private bus company in New York City, United States. It operated local service in Queens and express service to Manhattan until January 9, 2006, when the city-operated MTA Bus Company took over its routes. It was managed most recently by Jerome Cooper (1928–2015).

Green Bus Lines routes primarily operated in the Jamaica, Ozone Park, Howard Beach, South Jamaica, and the Rockaways areas of Queens, along with service to the passenger and cargo areas of John F. Kennedy International Airport. At the time of its closure, Green Lines operated more local and limited bus routes than any other private company in the city.

Stockholders of Green Bus Lines also held control of other private bus companies in Queens and Brooklyn as Transit Alliance. These companies were Triboro Coach, Jamaica Buses, and Command Bus Company, all of which were absorbed into the MTA Regional Bus operations. The company reorganized as GTJ Reit Inc., a real estate investment trust, shortly after MTA takeover.

History
The company was incorporated on April 3, 1925 by William Cooper (1895-1985, aged 90) and Martin Klein to provide local service in several boroughs. Cooper originally began operating a single bus line, a portion of today's Q8 101-Jerome Avenue route in 1922. The company was formed from several independently-operated bus lines, whose owners operated the buses, and would become stockholders and employees in Green Lines.

The company acquired several Manhattan routes (including the current M22, M50, M79, M86, and M96) in 1933, but these were transferred to the Comprehensive Omnibus Corporation in 1935 and New York City Omnibus Corporation in 1936. That year, Green Lines took over the operations of Liberty Bus, and the borough's bus system was divided into four lettered "zones", with each zone being served exclusively by one bus company. Green Lines was awarded the rights to all of "Zone C" in southern Queens, which included Woodhaven, Richmond Hill, Ozone Park, Howard Beach, and the Rockaways. With that move, Green Lines assumed the operations of seven other companies in the region. Green also acquired the Manhattan and Queens Bus Corporation, which had operated the ex-Manhattan and Queens Traction Company Queens Boulevard Line  into Manhattan (the ) since 1937, in 1943.

Green stockholders acquired two other transit companies that continued to operate independently: Triboro Coach Corporation in October 1947, and Jamaica Buses in April 1949. Jointly these three companies formed Command Bus Company in 1979 to take over the routes that had been previously operated by Pioneer Bus Corporation, which went out of the transit bus business following a bitter strike earlier in 1979.

The QM23 was started in the 1950s to replace Long Island Rail Road service to the Brooklyn Manor station on the Rockaway Beach Branch. It was discontinued in 2010.  Four more express routes began operation in the 1970s.

Reorganization as real estate investment trust

Green Bus Lines, Inc.; Triboro Coach Corporation; and Jamaica-Central Railways, Inc. were each owned by individual shareholders. Jamaica-Central Railways, Inc. had a wholly owned subsidiary, Jamaica Buses, Inc. Several subsidiary corporations were owned 40 percent by Green Bus Lines, Inc.; 40 percent by Triboro Coach Corporation; and 20 percent by Jamaica-Central Railways, Inc. These jointly owned subsidiary corporations included Command Bus Company, Inc., and G.T.J. Co., Inc. (originally Varsity Transit, Inc.). Among the wholly owned subsidiaries of G.T.J. Co., Inc. was Transit Facility Management Corp., which provided Access-A-Ride paratransit service using the name TFM Paratransit; Varsity Transit, Inc. (originally Varsity Coach Corp. until 1989), which provided school bus service within the City of New York; and Varsity Coach Corp. (incorporated 1989), which provided school bus service outside the City of New York.

On June 23, 2006, GTJ REIT, Inc. was formed under the laws of Maryland as a real estate investment trust. Two weeks later, on July 7, 2006, three wholly owned subsidies of GTJ REIT, Inc. were formed: Green Acquisition, Inc.; Triboro Acquisition, Inc.; and Jamaica Acquisition, Inc.

A special meeting of the shareholders of Green Bus Lines, Inc.; Triboro Coach Corporation; and Jamaica-Central Railways, Inc. was held on March 26, 2007 for the purpose of obtaining the consent of a majority of the shareholders of each company to be merged into the GTJ REIT, Inc. subsidiaries. A majority of shareholders of each company voted in favor, and on March 29, 2007 Green Bus Lines, Inc. was merged into Green Acquisition, Inc.; Triboro Coach Corporation was merged into Triboro Acquisition, Inc.; and Jamaica-Central Railways, Inc. was merged into Jamaica Acquisition, Inc. Shareholders exchanged their old shares in the bus companies for new shares in GTJ REIT, Inc. Command Bus Company, Inc. and Varsity Coach Corp. were both dissolved on January 21, 2010. Jamaica Buses, Inc. was dissolved on May 13, 2010.

During 2011 and 2012, the Company underwent a process of shedding all businesses and assets that were no longer compatible with its real estate focus.

In January 2013, the Company closed on a transaction with a privately held joint venture in which the Company acquired ownership interests in a portfolio of 25 commercial properties located in New York, New Jersey and Connecticut. As a result of subsequent acquisitions, the company owns 45 properties, approximately 5 million square feet and 338 acres of land.

GTJ REIT, Inc. is headquartered in West Hempstead, N.Y. Its portfolio of real estate investments includes the four garages (JFK Depot, LaGuardia Depot, Baisley Park Depot and the Far Rockaway Depot's older building) once used for transit bus operations, all of which are leased to the City of New York for use as bus garages by MTA Bus Company.

Bus routes
Just prior to MTA Bus takeover, Green Bus lines operated the following routes, which mostly continued to be based in Far Rockaway Bus Depot and John F. Kennedy Bus Depot. Hubs for Green Lines operations included 165th Street Bus Terminal in Jamaica, the Mott Avenue subway station in Far Rockaway, and several stations on the IND Queens Boulevard Line.

Depots

Original Idlewild depot
Green Bus Lines' first southeast Queens depot (also known as Cornell Park) was located at 149th Street and 147th Avenue  (148-02 147th Avenue) in what was then South Ozone Park, Queens. The facility, which contained an office building and a bus garage, opened in May 1939 at a cost of $250,000. This area has since been de-mapped and is now on the grounds of John F. Kennedy International Airport.

Second Idlewild/JFK depot

Green Lines' second southeast Queens garage was located in Jamaica at 147th Avenue and Rockaway Boulevard (165-25 147th Avenue) near JFK Airport. The depot was built from 1951 to 1952 at the cost of $500,000. It was the primary storage and maintenance facility for the company. It is now the John F. Kennedy Depot (or JFK Depot) of MTA Bus.

Rockaway Garage

Green Lines operated a facility on the Rockaway Peninsula, situated on Rockaway Beach Boulevard and Beach 49th Street (49-19 Rockaway Beach Boulevard) in the neighborhood of Arverne. It was sometimes referred to as the "Rockaway Garage". A satellite facility, it primarily housed buses serving the Rockaways and southern Queens, performing light maintenance work. It is now MTA Bus' Far Rockaway Depot.

References

Transport companies established in 1925
Bus transportation in New York City
Defunct public transport operators in the United States
Transport companies disestablished in 2006
1925 establishments in New York City
2006 disestablishments in New York (state)